Toss juggling is the form of juggling which is most recognisable as 'juggling'. Toss juggling can be used as: a performing art, a sport, a form of exercise, as meditation, a recreational pursuit or hobby.

In toss juggling, objects — such as balls, bean bags, rings, clubs, etc. — are thrown or tossed into the air and caught. Toss juggling is a form of object manipulation.

Juggling techniques and patterns 

'Toss juggling' has a number of basic principles and patterns. Most of the more complex patterns are variations of the basic ones and all toss juggling must conform to these basic principles.

Basic principles
Toss juggling is, according to most sources, the throwing and catching of objects, where there are more objects than there are hands (or sometimes other parts of the body) doing the throwing and catching. Three balls thrown and caught between two hands is toss juggling, as there are more balls than hands. Two balls between two hands would not be considered toss juggling, as the number of balls and hands is equal.

Basic patterns
There are three basic patterns in toss juggling with many variations, some exceedingly complex, that are based on these basic patterns.

Shower

The shower is the most commonly depicted pattern in pictures and illustrations of jugglers (although often wildly exaggerated). The objects juggled follow a circular pattern with one hand doing higher throws and the other passing or doing low throws to the first hand. This pattern can be used to juggle an odd number or even number of objects. In siteswap notation, a three object shower would be called 51.

Cascade

The cascade pattern is often the first pattern taught to beginner jugglers. The objects juggled follow a horizontal figure of eight pattern with each hand throwing the object to the same height when the previous throw has reached it peak. This pattern is most commonly used to juggle an odd number of objects. In siteswap notation, a three object cascade would be called 3.

Fountain

The fountain is where each hand throws and catches objects and they do not transfer to the opposite hand. This pattern is most commonly used to juggle an even number of objects. In siteswap notation, a four object fountain would be called 4.

Advanced patterns and tricks 

Besides the cascade (or reverse cascade), other toss patterns include the box or column, and any number of multiplex patterns or contact juggling tricks within the pattern.

There are also amusing stunts such as the  Yo-yo and the Robot, which give the illusion that the balls are connected to each other or to the juggler's body.  By adding elementary skills to any juggling pattern the pattern can be increased, incrementally, in complexity.

There are even wildly intricate patterns such as the Mills Mess, which is widely attributed to Steve Mills of The Dazzling Mills Family.  For a given pattern any number of variants may occur to the juggler, for instance, Mills Mess has at least three well-known variants, produced by adding flourishes such as chops, holds, stalls, and carries.  "Mills" colloquially refers to any pattern in juggling where the hands cross back and forth over one another. Any pattern valid in siteswap notation can be done "vanilla", reverse, and in Mills.

Other patterns 
Below is a list of other common three-ball patterns.
 Burke's Barrage
 Rubenstein's Revenge
 Flash

Performance 

Juggling has been used as a performance skill for thousands of years. Toss juggling has been significant in such performances and has continued to be a major part of juggling performances up to the present day. Juggling performances are of two main types: a performance which shows off the technical skill of the juggler and a performance of juggling with comedy. These two main types can be performed as shows, as walkabout entertainment or as stationary freestyle entertainment. All types of performances can be accompanied by music, other circus skills or other performers.

Passing and feeding

Passing is the juggling skill of throwing objects between two or more jugglers. The most common passing combination is where two jugglers throw six objects between them and perform various tricks in addition to that basic pattern. The number of objects juggled between two people can be increased with 7, 8 and even nine object passing being a common occurrence. Higher numbers have also been achieved with the current record for club passing being 13 clubs passed (juggled) between the two jugglers.

A variation on passing, called feeding, is performed by three or more jugglers. The most common combination is performed by three jugglers: one juggler (the feeder) passes alternately to each of the other two jugglers (the feedees) while they stand in a 'triangle'. The tempo of the juggling as well as the way the objects are thrown between the jugglers can be varied. Feeding can be performed with one feeder feeding multiple feedees or a mix of multiple feeders and feedees in one pattern.

Passing and feeding patterns and tricks in toss juggling range from the simple to the very complex. New patterns and tricks are developed and practiced at juggling conventions.

Sport 
As a sport, juggling can be done competitively, with the jugglers attempting to improve upon the tricks or performances of other jugglers within a range of disciplines and categories. Competitions are held for both solo and multiple juggling competitors. Jason Garfield popularised this form of juggling in the USA. This style of juggling became more popular after he organised a World Juggling Federation competition in 2004 which has now become an annual event.

Exercise and fitness 
As exercise, juggling is a highly aerobic activity, increasing the heart rate and respiration. Juggling helps one to develop good hand-eye coordination, physical fitness and balance.

Reflexes 
Juggling helps to develop quick reflexes, and in fact, jugglers develop "higher-order reflexes", reflexes not typically associated with normal human activity. These reflexes are formed through repetition of what are, at first, slowly learned and difficult processes. As the various processes develop into reflexive actions, additional, more difficult or complex skills are 'layered' atop previous, well-developed skills. These new more complex skills eventually become more reflexive, and eventually, various unusual high order reflexes develop. An example is that, while catching a raw chicken's egg may be quite challenging to a novice juggler, a more skilled juggler might be able to easily catch — unbroken — an egg thrown towards him without warning.

Meditation 
Paradoxically, the same processes that are well known for exercising the body, can also be a very relaxing activity.  As meditation, juggling a repeating pattern or patterns can take one's mind off the stresses they might encounter in their daily lives.  Jugglers have described a phenomenon of near-disembodiment and tranquility which may come over them while juggling.  The constant rising and falling of the objects, the regularity of the rhythms, can become almost hypnotic, and the attention of a juggler while tightly focused on the juggling pattern may seem to expand and even to "encompass the universe."

Recreation 
As a recreational pursuit, juggling excels in many ways.  Besides the previously mentioned health benefits, any form of juggling is at its best when done socially.  The equipment is inexpensive or free — though very costly equipment is also available — and easily portable.  Juggling is great for "breaking the ice" at parties and other social gatherings .  Jugglers are a friendly sort, usually, and are often very willing to help beginning jugglers with advice.  Juggling conventions, clubs and other gatherings where jugglers congregate can be great places to meet and share the art of juggling, for experts novices and even 'non-jugglers' — who often find themselves doing some form of juggling themselves.

In 1990 it was estimated by the International Jugglers' Association that twenty-three percent of Americans can juggle a three-ball cascade.

See also
 Catch (game)
 Joggling
 Juggling patterns and tricks for more toss juggling maneuvers.

References

Further reading
 Dancey, Charlie (1994). The Encyclopedia of Ball Juggling. Butterfingers. .
 Dancey, Charlie (1995). Compendium of Club Juggling. Butterfingers. .
 Finnigan, Dave; et al. (1992). The Complete Juggler. Butterfingers. .

 
Circus skills
Articles containing video clips